Butane or n-butane is an alkane with the formula C4H10. Butane is a highly flammable, colorless, easily liquefied gas that quickly vaporizes at room temperature and pressure. The name butane comes from the root but- (from butyric acid, named after the Greek word for butter) and the suffix -ane. It was discovered in crude petroleum in 1864 by Edmund Ronalds, who was the first to describe its properties, and commercialized by Walter O. Snelling in early 1910s.

Butane is one of a group of liquefied petroleum gases (LP gases). The others include propane, propylene, butadiene, butylene, isobutylene, and mixtures thereof. Butane burns more cleanly than gasoline and coal.

History 

The first accidental synthesis of butane was achieved by British chemist Edward Frankland in 1849 from ethyl iodide and zinc, but he hadn't realized that the ethyl radical dimerized and misidentified the substance.

The proper discoverer of the butane called it "hydride of butyl", but already in the 1860s more names were used: "butyl hydride", "hydride of tetryl" and "tetryl hydride", "diethyl" or "ethyl ethylide" and others. August Wilhelm von Hofmann in his 1866 systemic nomenclature proposed the name "quartane", and the modern name was introduced to English from German around 1874.

Butane didn't have much practical use until the 1910s, when W. Snelling identified butane and propane as components in gasoline and found that if they were cooled, they could be stored in a volume-reduced liquified state in pressurized containers.

Density 
The density of butane is highly dependent on temperature and pressure in the reservoir. For example, the density of liquid phase is 571.8±1 kg/m3 (for pressures up to 2MPa and temperature 27±0.2 °C), while the density of liquid butane is 625.5±0.7 kg/m3 (for pressures up to 2MPa and temperature -13±0.2 °C).

Isomers 

Rotation about the central C−C bond produces two different conformations (trans and gauche) for n-butane.

Reactions 

When oxygen is plentiful, butane burns to form carbon dioxide and water vapor; when oxygen is limited, carbon (soot) or carbon monoxide may also be formed. Butane is denser than air.

When there is sufficient oxygen:
 2 C4H10 + 13 O2 → 8 CO2 + 10 H2O
When oxygen is limited:
 2 C4H10 + 9 O2 → 8 CO + 10 H2O

n-Butane is the feedstock for DuPont's catalytic process for the preparation of maleic anhydride:
2 CH3CH2CH2CH3 + 7 O2 → 2 C2H2(CO)2O + 8 H2O

n-Butane, like all hydrocarbons, undergoes free radical chlorination providing both 1-chloro- and 2-chlorobutanes, as well as more highly chlorinated derivatives. The relative rates of the chlorination is partially explained by the differing bond dissociation energies, 425 and 411 kJ/mol for the two types of C-H bonds.

Uses 
Normal butane can be used for gasoline blending, as a fuel gas, fragrance extraction solvent, either alone or in a mixture with propane, and as a feedstock for the manufacture of ethylene and butadiene, a key ingredient of synthetic rubber. Isobutane is primarily used by refineries to enhance (increase) the octane number of motor gasoline.

For gasoline blending, n-butane is the main component used to manipulate the Reid vapor pressure (RVP). Since winter fuels require much higher vapor pressure for engines to start, refineries raise the RVP by blending more butane into the fuel. n-Butane has a relatively high research octane number (RON) and motor octane number (MON), which are 93 and 92 respectively.

When blended with propane and other hydrocarbons, the mixture may be referred to commercially as liquefied petroleum gas (LPG). It is used as a petrol component, as a feedstock for the production of base petrochemicals in steam cracking, as fuel for cigarette lighters and as a propellant in aerosol sprays such as deodorants.

Pure forms of butane, especially isobutane, are used as refrigerants and have largely replaced the ozone-layer-depleting halomethanes in refrigerators, freezers, and air conditioning systems. The operating pressure for butane is lower than for the halomethanes such as Freon-12 (R-12), so R-12 systems such as those in automotive air conditioning systems, when converted to pure butane, will function poorly. A mixture of isobutane and propane is used instead to give cooling system performance comparable to use of R-12.

Butane is also used as lighter fuel for a common lighter or butane torch and is sold bottled as a fuel for cooking, barbecues and camping stoves. The global market for butane canisters is dominated by South Korean manufacturers. In the 20th century the Braun (company) of Germany made a cordless hair styling device product that used butane as its heat source to produce steam.

As fuel, it is often mixed with small amounts of mercaptans to give the unburned gas an offensive smell easily detected by the human nose. In this way, butane leaks can easily be identified. While hydrogen sulfide and mercaptans are toxic, they are present in levels so low that suffocation and fire hazard by the butane becomes a concern far before toxicity. Most commercially available butane also contains some contaminant oil, which can be removed by filtration and will otherwise leave a deposit at the point of ignition and may eventually block the uniform flow of gas. 

The butane used as a solvent for fragrance extraction does not contain these contaminants and butane gas can cause gas explosions in poorly ventilated areas if leaks go unnoticed and are ignited by spark or flame. Purified butane is used as a solvent in the industrial extraction of cannabis oils.

Effects and health issues 

Inhalation of butane can cause euphoria, drowsiness, unconsciousness, asphyxia, cardiac arrhythmia, fluctuations in blood pressure and temporary memory loss, when abused directly from a highly pressurized container, and can result in death from asphyxiation and ventricular fibrillation. It enters the blood supply and within seconds produces intoxication. Butane is the most commonly abused volatile substance in the UK, and was the cause of 52% of solvent related deaths in 2000. "Sudden sniffer's death" syndrome, first described by Bass in 1970, is the most common single cause of solvent related death, resulting in 55% of known fatal cases.

See also 
 Cyclobutane
 Dimethyl ether
 Volatile substance abuse
 Butane (data page)
 Butanone
 n-Butanol
 Industrial gas

References

External links 

 International Chemical Safety Card 0232
 NIOSH Pocket Guide to Chemical Hazards

 
Alkanes
Fuel gas
Refrigerants
GABAA receptor positive allosteric modulators
E-number additives